Khoda Qoli may refer to:
 Khoda Qoli, East Azerbaijan
 Khoda Qoli, North Khorasan